Green Lightning may refer to:

Green Lightning (sculpture), a sculpture by artist Billie Lawless, built in Buffalo, New York
Green Lightning (computing), a problem with IBM 3278-9 computer terminals which evolved into a deliberate feature